Austrocallerya pilipes, synonym Callerya pilipes, is a species of flowering plant in the family Fabaceae, endemic to Queensland, Australia. It is a robust twining vine, climbing up trees and shrubs. It is known as the northern wistaria.

Description
Like the other species of Austrocallerya, A. pilipes is a robust, twining woody vine. It has evergreen leaves with 4–18 paired leaflets plus a terminal leaflet. Its flowers are arranged in a robust many-flowered terminal panicle. Also, the surface of the seed pod lacks longitudinal ridges or grooves.

Taxonomy
The species was first described by Frederick Manson Bailey in 1890 as Millettia pilipes. It was placed in the genus Callerya as Callerya pilipes by Anne M. Schot in 1994. A 2019 molecular phylogenetic study found that it did not belong either in the genus Millettia or in the genus Callerya, and placed it in a newly established genus Austrocallerya within an expanded tribe Wisterieae.

Distribution and habitat

References

Wisterieae
Endemic flora of Queensland
Plants described in 1890